The Western Mustangs men's ice hockey team represents Western University (in full, The University of Western Ontario) in Canadian university competition. The Mustangs are members of Ontario University Athletics, one of the four regional associations within the national governing body of U Sports. The Mustangs play at Thompson Arena in London, Ontario.

The men's hockey team has won 3 OUA championships (1994–95, 2004–05, 2008–09) and 1 U Sports championship (2001–02)

Team history

Early history 
In 1905, the first hockey club was established at the University of Western Ontario. The sporting teams were organized by the two faculties at Western during this time, the Arts & Divinity faculty and the Medical "Meds" faculty. The teams practiced on ice rinks around London, as well as on the Thames river. By the 1913-14 season, hockey became the most popular sport on campus and a combined faculty team went on to represent Western in the Canadian Hockey Association championships, playing Berlin (now Kitchener, Ontario) in the final match. Western lost 6-4.

Start of intercollegiate hockey 
Western entered the intercollegiate competition in the 1923-24 season. This league comprised St. Michael’s College of Toronto, the Ontario Agricultural College and the University of Toronto. The team also played some exhibition games during 1920s, including a game against Princeton University in the 1926-27 season and one against the University of Michigan in the 1928-29 season.

In the 1932-33 season, Western won its first Canadian Intermediate Intercollegiate Championship by beating the University of Ottawa in the finals 6-1. Hockey at Western proceeded into the 1930s but was suspended in 1941-44 due to WWII. After the war, the team kept competing in the Intermediate Intercollegiate league, as well as the senior London City League. 

The team continued until the mid 1950s. During this time, a lack of funding and ice time caused the team to be cancelled in 1955. The university did not have a rink at this time and there was little funding for intermediate teams.

Senior intercollegiate hockey and the OUA 
In the 1964-65 season, Western joined the Ontario-Quebec Athletic Association. This was due to large support from Bill L’Heureux over the years prior. During this season, L'Heureux acted as the coach and the team placed third in a ten-team league, finishing 4th in the playoffs. While attending Western, Brian Conacher played with the Mustangs during their first season. Ron Watson took over as coach in 1965 and coached the Mustangs for 20 seasons, leading the team to the playoffs 18 years out of his 20 year reign.

1980s - 2000s 
After Ron Watson, Barry Martinelli took over in 1985. Mike Tomlak played for Western in the 1986-87 season. The team had medium success during this time, but it started to rise when Steve Rucchin joined the Mustangs from 1990 to 1994. Rucchin scored 24 points in his first year, 62 points in his second, and 48 points in his third. On this rising success, Western won the first league OUA title in the 1994-95 season. Martinelli retired as coach in 1999, where the position was filled by the assistant coach at the time, Clarke Singer.

Clarke Singer is the current coach of the Western Mustangs and has been coaching the team since 1999. He has brought the team to its only national championship in 2001.

Season-by-season record
Note: GP = Games played, W = Wins, L = Losses, T = Ties

Notable players 
Western has had multiple NHL and All-Canadian players over the years. These include:

 Brian Conacher (NHL)
 Robbie Moore (NHL)
 Reg Higgs (NHL)
 Ian McKegney (NHL)
 Brent Imlach (NHL)
 Mike Tomlak (NHL and All-Canadian)
 Steve Rucchin (NHL and All-Canadian)
 Pete Fraser (All-Canadian)
 Chris McCauley (All-Canadian)
 Mark Guy (All-Canadian)
 Sean Basilio (All-Canadian)
 Jeff Petrie (All-Canadian)

References

External links
 Official website

Ice hockey teams in Ontario
University of Western Ontario
Sports teams in London, Ontario
U Sports men's ice hockey teams